Leeann Dempster is a Scottish football executive. She is the Chief Executive (CEO) of Queen's Park, having previously held the same position at Motherwell and Hibernian.

Career
Dempster worked in advertising before becoming sales and marketing director for Zoom Airlines for two years.

After the airline's collapse, John Boyle, co-founder of the airline and owner of Motherwell FC, recruited Dempster, first as general manager, then chief executive. In her time at Motherwell, the team finished second in the Scottish Premiership twice, and third once, reaching the qualifying rounds for the 2012–13 UEFA Champions League.

She moved to Hibernian in June 2014. The club won the Scottish Cup in 2016, for the first time since 1902. They achieved promotion to the Scottish Premiership in 2017, and subsequently finished in the top six twice.

On 26 November 2020, it was announced that Dempster would step down as CEO of Hibernian, after six years. On 12 January 2021, Queen's Park announced Dempster was to join the club as Chief Executive.

Personal life
Dempster was brought up in the East End of Glasgow by a Catholic mother and a Protestant father. Her family supported Rangers. Before her professional involvement in football, Dempster had been a Rangers season ticket holder but had long since let her attendance lapse.

Dempster has spoken about realising she was gay in her 20s. She entered into a civil partnership in 2007.

References

British chief executives
Association football executives
Living people
Women chief executives
Motherwell F.C. non-playing staff
Hibernian F.C. non-playing staff
Year of birth missing (living people)
Scottish LGBT sportspeople
Scottish LGBT businesspeople
Lesbian sportswomen
Lesbian businesswomen
Queen's Park F.C. non-playing staff